

References

2001
Films
Cambodian